A Double Shot at Love with the Ikki Twins, also referred to simply as A Double Shot at Love, is an American reality television dating game show that first aired weekly on MTV from December 9, 2008 to February 3, 2009. It is a spin-off of A Shot at Love with Tila Tequila. A reboot of the show starring Vinny Guadagnino and DJ Pauly D of Jersey Shore fame premiered in April 2019.

Format
A Double Shot at Love with the Ikki Twins is a bisexual-themed dating competition featuring 12 hetero males and 12 lesbian females living in a house with Rikki (Erica Mongeon) and Vikki (Victoria Mongeon) while competing for their attention and affection.

Post-show
One of the contestants, Kandice (Kandi) Hutchinson, died in a car crash shortly after the end of production. Out of respect to her family, the producers edited Hutchinson's scenes to remove some of her more outrageous behavior. The second episode of the series was dedicated to her memory.

On August 4, 2010, Vikki posted on her Myspace blog that she and Trevor had split up.

Episodes

 Episode numbering as per the episode list on the website

Episode progress

Call-out order

 The contestant won with both twins, but chose Vikki.
 The contestant is female.
 The contestant is male.
 The contestant was eliminated.
 The contestant won a challenge and went on a group date.
 The contestant won a challenge and went on an individual date.
 The contestant won two challenges and went on a group date and an individual date.
 The contestant won a challenge, but was eliminated.
 The contestant was eliminated outside of the elimination ceremony.
[m]The contestant was deemed the "MVP" by the twins.
 The call-out order is the order in which the contestants were given keys.
 In episode one, the eliminated contestants were asked to return their keys. Alphabetical order is used for the contestants who were allowed to keep their keys.

Reasons for elimination

Revival
In January 2019, MTV revived the show to now star Jersey Shore personalities Pauly D and Vinny Guadagnino. The revival premiered on April 11, 2019.

References

External links
 A Double Shot at Love Official Website
 A Double Shot at Love Trailer
 

2008 American television series debuts
2009 American television series endings
2000s American LGBT-related television series
2000s American reality television series
Bisexuality-related television series
American dating and relationship reality television series
MTV game shows
2000s American game shows
2000s LGBT-related reality television series
American television series revived after cancellation
American LGBT-related reality television series